Edgeworth Football Club is an Australian semi-professional football club based in the suburb of Edgeworth, near Newcastle, New South Wales. The club currently competes in the National Premier Leagues Northern NSW.

History
The suburb of Edgeworth was known as Young Wallsend until 1960. The first recorded football match involving a Young Wallsend team took place on 14 May 1892, when Minmi Rangers defeated Young Wallsend 3–0 at the Young Wallsend ground.

For most of the 20th century a lower-league club, Edgeworth won promotion into the Northern New South Wales 1st Division in 1973. Edgeworth made the 1st Division grand final in 1977, only to be defeated 1-0 by Weston. This loss was avenged in 1978, when Edgeworth emerged as unbeaten minor premiers and defeated Weston 2–0 in the grand final.

Edgeworth's most successful period was 2015-2020 where they were Premiers 5 times (2015, 2016, 2017, 2018, and 2020) and Champions four times (2015, 2016, 2019, and 2020). Prior to this their most successful run was when they finished first on the Northern New South Wales State League ladder from 1998 to 2000.

On 21 June 2015, Edgeworth qualified for the 2015 FFA Cup round of 32 after defeating Adamstown Rosebud 3–0 in the final qualifying round.
A goal in injury time to Melbourne City eliminated Edgeworth 2–1 in the round of 32.

Edgeworth were premiers of the 2015 National Premier League Northern NSW winning the league by three points. They were also champions after winning the grand final 2–0 over Hamilton Olympic.

Winning the premiership qualified Edgeworth for the 2015 National Premier League Finals. Edgeworth was drawn away to Moreton Bay United in the quarter-final, however, lost the game 3–1.

Current squad

References

External links
 Official website

1892 establishments in Australia
Association football clubs established in 1892
National Premier Leagues clubs
Soccer clubs in New South Wales
Sports teams in Newcastle, New South Wales